Bentheim may refer to:

Places
County of Bentheim, a state of the Holy Roman Empire from ca. 1228 to 1806, located in present-day Lower Saxony, Germany, roughly contiguous with the modern County of Bentheim district 
County of Bentheim (district), a district (Landkreis) in Lower Saxony, Germany
Bentheim Castle (Burg Bentheim), an early medieval castle in Bad Bentheim, Lower Saxony, Germany
Bad Bentheim, a town in Lower Saxony, Germany in the district of Grafschaft Bentheim known as Bentheim until 1979
Bentheim, a community within Overisel Township, Michigan, United States

Any of several historical political entities related to the County of Bentheim:
Bentheim-Alpen (1606–1629)
Bentheim-Bentheim, a county eventually comprising the County of Bentheim (1277–1530, 1643–1806)
Bentheim-Steinfurt, a county located in the region surrounding Steinfurt (1454–1806)
Bentheim-Limburg (1606–1632)
Bentheim-Lingen (1450–1555)
Bentheim-Tecklenburg (1277–1557)
Bentheim-Tecklenburg-Rheda (1606–1806)

Animals
Bentheimer Landschaf, a breed of domesticated sheep found in Germany
Bentheim Black Pied pig, a breed of domestic pig found in Germany

Art
Bentheim Castle (Dublin), a 1653 oil on canvas painting by the Dutch painter Jacob van Ruisdael

See also
Benthem (disambiguation)
Bentheim (noble family), the former rulers of the County of Bentheim
View of Bentheim Castle, a 1650s oil on canvas painting by the Dutch painter Jacob van Ruisdael